The Andhra Pradesh Auto and Trolley Drivers Union (APATDU) is a trade union of auto rickshaw and trolley drivers in Andhra Pradesh, India. APATDU is affiliated with the Centre of Indian Trade Unions.

History
In May 2002, APATDU criticised police for the detainment of vehicles to collect fines from their drivers. The union demanded a stop to the detainment and threatened a demonstration if the demand would not be met. On July 23, APATDU led a protest in Hyderabad.

In February 2003, APATDU called for a four-day strike in Hyderabad against police harassment, illegal imposition of fines and the groundless seizure of cars. The strike was called off following a meeting of general secretary Bhoopal with home minister Devender Goud.

In 2013, APATDU took part in a general transport strike in Hyderabad, demanding the instatement of a welfare board.

References

Trade unions in India
Centre of Indian Trade Unions
Road transport trade unions
Trade unions in Andhra Pradesh
Transport trade unions in India
Year of establishment missing